The Approuague river (or Apuruaque in Tupi) is a major river in French Guiana. It runs north from the Tumuk Humak Mountains to the Atlantic Ocean, almost parallel with the Oyapock, with its mouth by the Pointe Béhague cape.

References

Rivers of French Guiana
Rivers of France